Siddall is a surname. Notable people with the surname include:

Arthur Siddall (born 1943), retired Anglican priest
Barry Siddall (born 1954), English professional football goalkeeper
Brian Siddall (1930–2007), English footballer
Brianne Siddall, (aka Ian Hawk & Brianne Brozey), American voice actress
Christopher Siddall (born 1979), English cricketer
Elizabeth Siddall, (1829–1862), Pre-Raphaelite model, poet, and artist
Gary Siddall (born 1957), English rugby league player for Featherstone Rovers and Huddersfield
Joe Siddall (born 1967), Canadian former Major League Baseball catcher
Joseph Bower Siddall (1840–1904), British doctor, foreign advisor in Japan
Lauren Siddall, (born 1984), professional squash player who represented England
Louise Siddall (1879–1935), American composer
Samantha Siddall (born 1982), English actress on Channel 4 series Shameless
Teddi Siddall (born 1953), American actress

See also
Siddal